The Women's 10 metre air pistol event at the 2016 Olympic Games took place on 7 August 2016 at the National Shooting Center.

The event consisted of two rounds: a qualifier and a final. In the qualifier, each shooter fired 40 shots with an air pistol at 10 metres distance. Scores for each shot were in increments of 1, with a maximum score of 10.

The top 8 shooters in the qualifying round moved on to the final round. There, they fired an additional 20 shots. These shots scored in increments of .1, with a maximum score of 10.9.

The medals were presented by Barbara Kendall, IOC member, New Zealand and Gary Anderson, Vice President of the International Shooting Sport Federation.

Records
Prior to this competition, the existing world and Olympic records were as follows.

Qualification round

Final

References

Shooting at the 2016 Summer Olympics
Olym
Women's events at the 2016 Summer Olympics